Luke de Woolfson (born 7 March 1976) is a British film and television actor.

Filmography
2000: Urban Gothic as Noddy (1 episode in TV series)
2001: Model, Actress, Whatever as Matt (TV movie)
2001: Late Night Shopping as Sean
2001: Large as Jason Mouseley
2002: Bookcruncher as Bookcruncher (short)
2002: The House That Jack Built as JJ Squire (6 episodes in  TV series)
2002: Midsomer Murders as Paul Starkey (1 episode in TV series)
2003: The Reckoning as Daniel
2003: Pirates of the Caribbean: The Curse of the Black Pearl as Frightened Sailor
2003: Spine Chillers as Dave (1 episode "Goth" in TV series)
2003: Where the Heart Is as Russel Naylor (4 episodes in TV series)
2003: Shooting Blanks as Martin (short)
2003: Foyle's War as Harry Markham (1 episode "War Games" in TV series)
2004: Holby City as Private O'Brien (1 episode in In the Line of Fire)
2005: The Bill as Ryan Flynn (1 episode in "315" in TV series)
2005: Mile High as Robbie (1 episode in TV series)
2005: Stoned as Mick Jagger
2006: Pirates of the Caribbean: Dead Man's Chest as the Terrified and the Horrified British Sailor
2007: Popcorn as Zak
2007: Worth as Reg 1 (short)
2007: Holby City as Marcus Coe (1 episode "For Whom the Bell Tolls" in TV series)
2008: Reverb as Dan
2008: Criminal Justice as Stuart Napier (1 episode in TV mini-series)
2008: Holby City as Rory Westley (1 episode "Or I'll Never Fall in Love" in TV series)
2008: The Bill as Colin Mackie (1 episode in Forgotten Child: Part 1 in TV series)
2009: Best: His Mother's Son as Dave Sadler (TV movie)
2009: Mr. Right as Alex
2010: Shank as Whisper
2010: Forget Me Not as Luke
2019: Killing Eve

External links

English male film actors
English male television actors
1976 births
Living people
People from Woodbridge, Suffolk
Male actors from Suffolk